The 2019 FFA Cup preliminary rounds were the qualifying competition to decide 21 of the 32 teams to take part in the 2019 FFA Cup Round of 32, along with the 10 A-League clubs and reigning National Premier Leagues champion, Campbelltown City. The preliminary rounds operated within a consistent national structure whereby club entry into the competition was staggered in each federation, with the winning clubs from Round 7 of the preliminary rounds in each member federation gaining entry into the Round of 32. All Australian clubs were eligible to enter the qualifying process through their respective FFA member federation, however only one team per club was permitted entry in the competition.

Schedule
The number of fixtures for each round, and the match dates for each Federation, were as follows.

 Some round dates in respective Federations overlap due to separate scheduling of Zones/Sub-Zones.

Format
The preliminary rounds structures were as follows, and refer to the different levels in the unofficial Australian association football league system:

First qualifying round:
15 Victorian clubs level 9 and below entered this stage.
Second qualifying round:
56 Victorian clubs (9 from the previous round and 47 level 8) entered this stage.
First round:
9 Queensland clubs level 4 entered this stage.
88 Victorian clubs (28 from the previous round and 60 level 6–7) entered this stage.
6 Western Australian clubs (Regional and Masters) entered this stage.
Second round:
96 New South Wales clubs (Association teams, level 6 and below) entered this stage.
54 Northern New South Wales clubs level 4 and below entered this stage.
81 Queensland clubs (5 from the previous round and 76 level 4 and below) entered this stage.
54 South Australian clubs level 2 and below entered this stage.
80 Victorian clubs (40 from the previous round and 36 level 5–6) entered this stage.
19 Western Australian clubs (3 from the previous round and 16 level 5 and below) entered this stage.
Third round:
8 Australian Capital Territory clubs level 3 and below entered this stage.
114 New South Wales clubs (89 from the previous round and 25 level 4–5) entered this stage.
43 Northern New South Wales clubs (32 from the previous round and 11 level 3) entered this stage.
78 Queensland clubs (58 from the previous round and 20 level 2 and below) entered this stage.
32 South Australian clubs progressed to this stage.
13 Tasmanian clubs (level 3) entered this stage.
64 Victorian clubs (40 from the previous round and 24 level 4) entered this stage.
38 Western Australian clubs (15 from the previous round and 23 level 3–4) entered this stage.
Fourth round:
16 Australian Capital Territory clubs (4 from the previous round and 12 level 2–3) entered this stage.
80 New South Wales clubs (57 from the previous round and 23 level 2–3) entered this stage.
32 Northern New South Wales clubs (22 from the previous round and 10 level 2) entered this stage.
13 Northern Territory clubs (9 from the Darwin zone and 4 from the Alice Springs zone; level 2 and below) entered  this stage.
64 Queensland clubs (41 from the previous round and 23 level 2–3) entered this stage.
16 South Australian clubs progressed to this stage.
16 Tasmanian clubs (7 from the previous round and 9 level 2) entered this stage.
64 Victorian clubs (32 from the previous round and 32 level 2–3) entered this stage.
32 Western Australian clubs (21 from the previous round and 11 level 2) entered this stage.
Fifth round:
8 Australian Capital Territory clubs progressed to this stage.
40 New South Wales clubs progressed to this stage.
16 Northern New South Wales clubs progressed to this stage.
7 Northern Territory clubs (5 from the Darwin zone, and 2 from the Alice Springs zone) progressed to this stage.
32 Queensland clubs progressed to this stage; 8 from Central and North Queensland, and 24 from South East Queensland.
8 South Australian clubs progressed to this stage.
8 Tasmanian clubs progressed to this stage.
32 Victorian clubs progressed to this stage.
16 Western Australian clubs progressed to this stage.
Sixth round:
4 Australian Capital Territory clubs progressed to this stage.
20 New South Wales progressed to this stage.
8 Northern New South Wales clubs progressed to this stage.
4 Northern Territory clubs (3 from the Darwin zone, and the winner of the Alice Springs zone) progressed to this stage.
16 Queensland clubs progressed to this stage; 4 from Central and North Queensland, and 12 from South East Queensland.
4 South Australian clubs progressed to this stage.
4 Tasmanian clubs progressed to this stage.
16 Victorian clubs progressed to this stage.
8 Western Australian clubs progressed to this stage.
Seventh round:
2 Australian Capital Territory clubs progressed to this stage, which doubled as the Final of the Federation Cup.
10 New South Wales clubs progressed to this stage. The 5 winners also participated in the final rounds of the Waratah Cup.
4 Northern New South Wales clubs progressed to this stage.
2 Northern Territory clubs progressed to this stage, which doubled as the final of the Sport Minister's Cup.
8 Queensland clubs progressed to this stage; 2 from Central and North Queensland, and 6 from South East Queensland.
2 South Australian clubs progressed to this stage, which doubled as the Grand Final of the Federation Cup.
2 Tasmanian clubs progressed to this stage, which doubled as the Grand Final of the Milan Lakoseljac Cup.
8 Victorian clubs progressed to this stage. The 4 winners also qualified to the final rounds of the Dockerty Cup.
4 Western Australian clubs progressed to this stage. The 2 winners also participated in the Final of the Football West State Cup.

Note: Campbelltown City did not participate in the South Australian qualifying rounds, as they had already qualified into the FFA Cup as 2018 National Premier Leagues champions.

Note: A-League Youth teams playing in their respective federation leagues were specifically excluded from the preliminary rounds as their respective Senior A-League clubs were already part of the competition.

Key to Abbreviations

First qualifying round

Notes
 w/o = Walkover
 VIC Byes – Castlemaine Goldfields (10), Twin City Wanderers (9), Wangaratta City (9).

Second qualifying round

Notes
 w/o = Walkover
 † = After Extra Time

First round

Notes
 w/o = Walkover
 † = After Extra Time
 QLD Byes – Across The Waves (4).

Second round

Notes
 w/o = Walkover
 † = After Extra Time
 NSW Byes – Abbotsford Juniors (-), Albion Park City Razorbacks (-), Albion Park White Eagles (-), Ararat FC (-), Arncliffe Aurora (-), Balmain & District (-), Banksia Tigers (-), Bankstown Sports Strikers (-), Baulkham Hills (-), Blacktown Workers (-), Blue Mountains (-), Brookvale FC (-), Budgewoi FC (-), Bulli FC (-), Coledale Waves (-), Coniston FC (-), Coogee United (-), Cronulla Seagulls (-), Doyalson-Wyee (-), Emu Plains (-), Epping Eastwood (-), Epping FC (-), Forest Killarney (-), Gerringong Breakers (-), Gladesville Ravens Sports Club (-), Glenmore Park (-), Greenacre Eagles (-), Gwandalan Summerland Point (-), Gymea United (-), Harrington United (-), Hazelbrook FC (-), IFS Community Wolves (-), Kanwal Warnervale Rovers (-), Kariong United (-), Kellyville Colts (-), Kemps Creek United (-), Kenthurst & District (-), Killarney District (-), Kirrawee Kangaroos (-), Lilli Pilli (-), Lindfield FC (-), Lugarno FC (-), Macquarie Dragons (-), Manly Allambie United (-), Marayong FC (-), Menai Hawks (-), Moorebank Sports (-), North Rocks (-), North Sydney United (-), Norwest FC (-), Old Barker (-), Pagewood Botany (-), Peakhurst United (-), Pendle Hill (-), Pennant Hills (-), Pittwater RSL (-), Putney Rangers (-), Quakers Hill (-), Randwick City (-), Redbacks FC (-), Revesby Rovers (-), Revesby Workers (-), Rouse Hill Rams (-), Ryde Saints United (-), Southern & Ettalong (-), Strathfield FC (-), Sydney CBD (-), Sydney Dragon (-), Sydney Rangers (-), Tarrawanna Blueys (-), Terrigal United (-), The Ponds (-), Thornleigh Thunder (-), Umina United (-), Waverley Old Boys (-), West Pennant Hills Cherrybrook (-), West Ryde Rovers (-), Winston Hills (-), Wollongong Olympic (-), Woonona Sharks (-), Woy Woy (-), Wyoming FC (-).
 NNSW Byes – Armidale City Westside (4), Bangalow (4), Kempsey Saints (4), Lake Macquarie FC (-), Macleay Valley Rangers (4), Mayfield United Senior (-), Raymond Terrace (-), Swansea FC (–), Tamworth FC (4), Woolgoolga Wolves (4).
 QLD Byes – AC Carina (5), Acacia Ridge (4), Bardon Latrobe (6), Beerwah Glasshouse United (4), Bilambil Terramora (6), Bluebirds United (4), Brisbane Knights (4), Caboolture Sports (4), Caloundra (4), Centenary Stormers (4), Frenchville (4), Gympie United (4), Jimboomba United (7), Kawana (4), KSS Jets (4), Logan Metro (7), Maroochydore Swans (4), Mudgeeraba (4), New Farm United (5), Noosa Lions (4), North Lakes Mustangs (7), North Star (5), Palm Beach Sharks (4), Park Ridge (6), Ridge Hills (7), Rockville Rovers (4), Slacks Creek (6), Southport (5), Southside United (4), Sunbury Blues (4), The Lakes (6), United Park Eagles (4), UQFC (4), Western Spirit (5), Westside (6).
 SA Byes – Adelaide Blue Eagles (2), Adelaide City (2), Adelaide Comets (2), Adelaide Olympic (2), Adelaide Raiders (2), Campbelltown City (2), Croydon Kings (2), North Eastern MetroStars (2), Para Hills Knights (2), South Adelaide (2).  
 WA Byes – Albany Caledonian (-), BrOzzy Sports Club (9), Bunbury Dynamos (-),  Maccabi SC (8), Mindarie FC (12), North Beach (7), Polonia FC (-), Port Kennedy (6), Westnam United (7), Warnbro Strikers SC (6), Yanchep United (8).

Third round

Notes
 w/o = Walkover
 † = After Extra Time
 NNSW Byes – South Cardiff (3).
 QLD Byes – MA Olympic (4), Rebels Gunners (4), Townsville Warriors (4), United Park Eagles (4). 
 TAS Byes – Hobart United (3).
 WA Byes – Canning City (4), Joondalup City (4), Kelmscott Roos (4), UWA-Nedlands (3).

Fourth round

Notes:
 w/o = Walkover
 † = After Extra Time
 NT Byes – Hellenic AC (2)

Fifth round

Notes:
 † = After Extra Time
 NT Byes – Casuarina FC (2)

Sixth round

Seventh round

Notes
 † = After Extra Time

References

External links
 Official website

Australia, preliminary
FFA Cup preliminary
Australia Cup preliminary rounds